Baan is a Dutch surname with a variety of origins. Variant forms are Baans, Baen, De Baan, De Baen and Van der Baan.  It can be patronymic, where Baan or Bane may be, among others, a short form of Urbanus. Alternatively, given that Dutch baan can mean "lane" or "track", it may be a toponymic or metonymic occupational surname, referring e.g. to a kaatser or road maker. People with this name include:

Baan
 David Baan (1908–1984), Dutch boxer
 Iwan Baan (born 1975), Dutch photographer
 Jan Baan (born 1946), Dutch entrepreneur and venture capitalist, brother of Paul
 Paul Baan (born 1951), Dutch entrepreneur and venture capitalist, brother of Jan
 Baan Corporation, software company founded by Jan and Paul Baan
  (1912–1975), Dutch forensic psychiater, namesake of the Pieter Baan Centre
 Rob Baan (born 1943), Dutch football coach

Baans
 Madelon Baans (born 1977), Dutch breaststroke swimmer

Baen
 Jim Baen (1943–2006), American science fiction publisher and editor (Baen Books)

De Baan and De Baen
 Jan de Baan or de Baen (1633–1702), Dutch portrait painter
 Jacobus de Baan or de Baen (1673–1700), Dutch portrait painter, son of Jan

See also 
 Baan (disambiguation)
 Huda al-Baan (born ca. 1960), Yemeni politician
 László Baán (born 1961), Hungarian economist and museum curator
 Willem-Alexander Baan, an artificial rowing lake in the Netherlands

References 

Dutch-language surnames